Eduard Konstantinovich Zatsepin (born 27 April 1974) is a Russian former professional footballer.

Honours
 Russian Second Division Zone Ural/Povolzhye best player: 2005.
 Russian Second Division top scorer: 1997 (Zone Center, 26 goals), 2005 (Zone Ural/Povolzhye, 36 goals).

External links
 
 

1974 births
People from Michurinsk
Living people
Russian footballers
Russian expatriate footballers
Expatriate footballers in Kazakhstan
Expatriate footballers in Belarus
Russian expatriate sportspeople in Kazakhstan
Russian Premier League players
FC Spartak Tambov players
FC Mordovia Saransk players
FC Zhemchuzhina Sochi players
FC Shinnik Yaroslavl players
FC Metallurg Lipetsk players
FC Volgar Astrakhan players
FC Dynamo Bryansk players
FC Sodovik Sterlitamak players
FC Salyut Belgorod players
FC Irtysh Pavlodar players
FC Vitebsk players
Association football forwards
FC Avangard Kursk players
Sportspeople from Tambov Oblast